Barkston Ash was a wapentake of the West Riding of Yorkshire, named after the meeting-place at the village of Barkston. It included the parishes of Birkin, Bramham cum Oglethorpe, Brayton, Drax, Kirk Fenton, Ledsham, Monk Fryston, Saxton with Scarthingwell and Sherburn-in-Elmet and parts of Brotherton, Kirkby Wharfe, Ryther, Snaith and Tadcaster.

References

Wapentakes of the West Riding of Yorkshire